The McLaren Young Driver Programme (formerly known as the McLaren Driver Development Programme, the McLaren-Mercedes Young Driver Support Programme, and the McLaren-Honda Young Driver Programme) is a driver development program operated by McLaren. It is intended to offer year-by-year guidance, assistance and endorsement to help promising young racers climb the motorsport ladder.

The most notable participant in the programme is Lewis Hamilton, who joined the programme while karting and eventually graduated to the McLaren F1 team.

As of the  season, 4 drivers have graduated from the programme to the McLaren F1 team; Hamilton in 2007, Kevin Magnussen in 2014, Stoffel Vandoorne in 2016, and Lando Norris in 2019.

From 2019 to 2021, no drivers were part of the program, which McLaren Racing CEO Zak Brown said was due to the team's "very targeted" approach and already stable F1 line-up, meaning it would be difficult for any young drivers to find a place in Formula One. In March 2021, American karting driver Ugo Ugochukwu was recruited into the programme.

Drivers

Current

Former

 Championship titles highlighted in bold.

See also
McLaren Autosport BRDC Award
McLaren GT Driver Academy

References

External links
 McLaren Young Driver Programme
 McLaren

Racing schools
McLaren Group